SpaceX CRS-27, also known as SpX-27, is a Commercial Resupply Service mission to the International Space Station (ISS) launched on 15 March 2023. The mission is contracted by NASA and will be flown by SpaceX using a Cargo Dragon. This will be the seventh flight for SpaceX under NASA's CRS Phase 2.

Cargo Dragon 

SpaceX plans to reuse the Cargo Dragons up to five times. The Cargo Dragon will launch without SuperDraco abort engines, without seats, cockpit controls and the life support system required to sustain astronauts in space. Dragon 2 improves on Dragon 1 in several ways, including lessened refurbishment time, leading to shorter periods between flights.

The new Cargo Dragon capsules under the NASA CRS Phase 2 contract will land east of Florida in the Atlantic Ocean.

Payload 
NASA contracted for the CRS-27 mission from SpaceX and therefore determines the primary payload, date of launch, and orbital parameters for the Cargo Dragon.
 Science investigations: ~
 Vehicle hardware: ~
 Crew supplies: ~
 Spacewalk equipment: ~
 Computer resources: ~-
 External payloads:

STP-H9 
A technology demonstration mission which consists of the following payloads: 

 SWELL (Space Wireless Energy Laser Link), A test payload for Laser Communications a follow on to OPALS.
 Electric Propulsion Electrostatic Analyzer, A test device that will demonstrate re-boost using Ion Propulsion.
 Neutron Radiation Detection Instrument from NRL
 Variable Voltage Ion Protection Experiment from NRL
 ECLIPSE (Experiment for Characterizing the Lower Ionosphere and Production of Sporadic-E)
 Glowbug, cosmic ray detector built in conjunction with NASA, an experiment that will study cosmic rays for two years.
 SpaceCube Edge Node Intelligent Collaboration, an experiment built by NASA Goddard that will study microchips and artificial intelligence exposed to the vacuum of space.
 SOHIP, a hyperspectral imager  built by Livermore Labs that will study the atmosphere for two years.

Research 
The new experiments arriving at the orbiting laboratory will inspire future scientists and explorers, and provide valuable insight for researchers. These include student projects that were given the opportunity to fly and operate their experiments on the ISS as part of DLR's Überflieger 2 competition. Among them are the projects: 
 FARGO (Ferrofluid Application Research Goes Orbital) of the Small Satellite Student Society of the University of Stuttgart (KSat e.V.)
 Glücksklee
 BRAINS (Biological Research using Artificial Intelligence for Neuroscience in Space)
 ADDONISS (Ageing and Degenerative Diseases of Neurons on the ISS)

European Space Agency (ESA) research and activities:
 ESA's BIOFILMS (Biofilm Inhibition On Flight equipment and on board the ISS using microbiologically Lethal Metal Surfaces) experiment investigating bacterial biofilm formation and antimicrobial properties of different metal surfaces under spaceflight conditions in altered gravity.

NASA Glenn Research Center studies:

Materials International Space Station Experiment MISSE-17:
 Vitrimeric reversible adhesive for in-space assembly

CubeSats 
CubeSats planned for this mission:

NEUDOSE

The NEUtron DOSimetry & Exploration (NEUDOSE) mission from the McMaster Interdisciplinary Satellite Team aims to further our understanding of long-term exposure to space radiation by investigating how charged and neutral particles contribute to the human equivalent dose during low-Earth orbit (LEO) missions. NEUDOSE is a 2U CubeSat built by students at McMaster University. The scientific goals of the project are to:

 Demonstrate the Charged & Neutral Particle Tissue Equivalent Proportional Counter (CNP-TEPC) instrument, that allows for the discrimination of dose from charged and neutral particles in real-time.
 Map the contribution of charged and neutral particle dose rates in LEO.

The mission objectives also include providing early-career science and engineering students with valuable leadership, technical, and flight project development skills. Furthermore, the NEUDOSE mission is involved with the development of amateur radio operators and custom hardware.

Northern SPIRIT

Three CubeSat satellites were built in part of the Northern Space Program for Innovative Research and Integrated Training (Northern SPIRIT). These CubeSats were constructed as a collaboration between Yukon University, Aurora Research Institute in the Northwest Territories, and the University of Alberta. This initiative is supported by the Canadian Space Agency (CSA) as a part of the Canadian CubeSat Project (CCP). In addition to what's below, all three satellites have a primary goal of gathering magnetic field data of the ionosphere to study small scale field-aligned currents.

 Ex-Alta 2:  A 3U CubeSat built by students from the University of Alberta's student organization AlbertaSat. Ex-Alta 2's primary mission is to obtain scientific data for wildfire research and prevention. Additionally, Ex-Alta 2 was designed to promote the long-term goal of a fully open-sourced cube satellite, and the development of the Albertan commercial space industry. 
 AuroraSAT and YukonSat: 2U CubeSats built by students from the Aurora Research Institute and Yukon University in collaboration with the University of Alberta, who provided the bus for each cubesat and did final integration of payloads. One of the two primary missions is the Northern Images Mission, which will display art on a small screen on the satellite, and then take images of this art from space with the Earth in the background. Children across Northern Canada will have the opportunity to have their artwork featured. The Northern Voices Mission will transmit and broadcast recordings of Northern Canadian stories and perspectives in amateur radio bands across the world.

ELaNa 50

This new iteration of the ELaNa (Educational Launch of Nanosatellites) initiative will consist of two cubesats from American education institutes:

 ARKSat-1: 1U CubeSat developed by students at the University of Arkansas, its main mission will be to perform atmospheric measurements through the ground detection of a LED signal from orbit. Furthermore after the end of the mission the cubesat will make use of a Solid State Inflatable Balloon (SSIB) to increase the spacecraft's drag and speed up its re-entry.
 LightCube: 1U CubeSat developed by students at the Arizona State University, it carries a flash bulb that can be remotely activated by radio amateurs to produce a brief flash visible from the ground.

See also 

 Uncrewed spaceflights to the International Space Station

References 

SpaceX Dragon 2
SpaceX payloads contracted by NASA
Supply vehicles for the International Space Station
Spacecraft launched in 2023
2023 in the United States